Racecourse is a station on the  of Hong Kong. It was opened on 1 October 1985 and is only used on race days and special days held in the Sha Tin Racecourse. There are single journey tickets to the station available separately.

History
Racecourse station originally opened along with the eponymous racecourse on 7 October 1978.

The current Racecourse station opened on 1 October 1985, in time to serve a new grandstand at the racecourse.

A renovation of the station was completed in 1996.

Station layout
Racecourse has one island platform. Unlike at other MTR stations, trains can arrive at either platform regardless of direction, so passengers need to follow directions of MTR staff and the electronic displays for the direction of trains. Both directions usually have a headway of 10–15 minutes.

The station does not have escalators or lifts. Wheelchair users can only use a stair lift to access the station after calling a member of staff for assistance.

Entrances/Exits
 A: Racecourse Grandstand (Gate 1 & 2)
 B: Racecourse Grandstand (Gate 3 & 4)
 C: Racecourse Grandstand (Gate 5 & 6)
There are three footbridges that link the platform to the station concourse near the grandstand. There are no other entrances to access the station.

Gallery

References

MTR stations in the New Territories
East Rail line
Sha Tin District
Former Kowloon–Canton Railway stations
Railway stations in Hong Kong opened in 1985
1985 establishments in Hong Kong